"We Don't Exist" is the first promotional single from the Meat Puppets album Too High to Die. Released in 1994, it includes two versions of "We Don’t Exist" and the Marty Robbins cover "El Paso City". The Marty Robbins cover is also released on the Raw Meat EP.

Track listing
(All songs by Curt Kirkwood unless otherwise noted)

 "We Don't Exist" (remix) - 3:46
 "We Don't Exist" - 3:45
 "El Paso City" (Marty Robbins) - 3:43

The Australian release features the above, plus a live version of 'Lake of Fire'.

Music video
The music video for We Don't Exist shows the band playing in a black and white town. It was nominated for Best Rock Video at the 1995 MTV Video Music Awards.

References

Meat Puppets songs
1994 singles
Songs written by Curt Kirkwood
1994 songs
London Records singles